Rosemary Jeanne Redfield is a microbiologist associated with the University of British Columbia where she worked as a faculty member in the Department of Zoology from 1993 until retiring in 2021.

Education 
Redfield completed her undergraduate degree in biochemistry at Monash University.  She continued her education at McMaster University where she completed her MSc in 1980. Her thesis titled, "Methylation and chromatin conformation of adenovirus type 12 DNA sequences in transformed cells," dealt with the chromatin structure and SDNA methylation. Redfield received her PhD in Biological Sciences from Stanford University under Allan M. Campbell.

Research and career
Redfield completed postdoctoral work at Harvard University with Richard Charles Lewontin and Johns Hopkins School of Medicine with Hamilton O. Smith, an American microbiologist and 1978 Nobel Laureate. She played an early role in the refutation of the GFAJ-1 "arsenic life" results of Felisa Wolfe-Simon. She retired in 2021.

Select publications

Awards 
 CIHR Grant (1999) - Regulation of competence in haemophilus influenzae
 CIHR Grant (2012) - Regulation of CRP-S promoters in H. Influenzae and E. Coli
 Nominated by Nature as one of Nature's 10 people who mattered in 2011.

References

External links 
 

Year of birth missing (living people)
Living people
Canadian microbiologists
Academic staff of the University of British Columbia
Canadian women scientists
Evolutionary biologists
Women evolutionary biologists